Riikka Honkanen (born 17 July 1998) is a Finnish alpine ski racer.

World Cup results

Season standings

Results per discipline

Standings through 5 March 2023

World Championship results

Other results

European Cup results

Season standings

Results per discipline

Standings through 5 March 2023

Far East Cup results

Season standings

Results per discipline

Standings through 25 January 2021

Race podiums
 1 win – (1 GS)
 6 podiums – (3 SL, 3 GS)

South American Cup results

Season standings

Results per discipline

Standings through 26 January 2021

Race podiums
 1 podium – (GS)

References

External links
 
 

1998 births
Living people
Finnish female alpine skiers
Alpine skiers at the 2016 Winter Youth Olympics
Alpine skiers at the 2022 Winter Olympics
Olympic alpine skiers of Finland